Old Federal Reserve Bank Building may refer to:
Old Federal Reserve Bank Building (Philadelphia)
Old Federal Reserve Bank Building (San Francisco)

See also
Federal Reserve Bank Building (disambiguation)